Benoit Gaudet (born December 18, 1979 in Drummondville, Quebec, Canada) is a professional Canadian boxer in the Lightweight division. He's the former Canadian National Lightweight and North American Boxing Association Super Featherweight champion.

Amateur career
Gaudet won a bronze medal in the bantamweight division at the 1999 World Amateur Boxing Championships in Houston, Texas. He also won a bronze medal in the featherweight category at the 2002 Commonwealth Games in Manchester, England. In the featherweight category at the 2004 Summer Olympics, he defeated Somluck Kamsing of Thailand before being eliminated by Jo Seok-hwan of South Korea.

Pro career
In November 2007, Gaudet beat the veteran Alberto Garza to win the North American Boxing Association Super Featherweight championship.

WBC Super Featherweight Championship
On May 2, 2009 Gaudet was knocked out by WBC Super Featherweight champion Humberto Soto in the ninth rounds.

References

External links

Lightweight boxers
1981 births
Living people
Sportspeople from Drummondville
Sportspeople from Quebec
Olympic boxers of Canada
Boxers at the 2004 Summer Olympics
Canadian male boxers
Boxers at the 2002 Commonwealth Games
Commonwealth Games medallists in boxing
Commonwealth Games bronze medallists for Canada
Boxers at the 1999 Pan American Games
Boxers at the 2003 Pan American Games
Pan American Games competitors for Canada
AIBA World Boxing Championships medalists
Medallists at the 2002 Commonwealth Games